Russia's Tyumen Oblast participated in the Turkvision Song Contest for the first time at the Turkvision Song Contest 2020, hosted in Istanbul, Turkey.

Origins of the contest

Turkvision is an annual song contest which was created by TÜRKSOY in cooperation with the Turkish music channel TMB TV. Based on the similar format of the Eurovision Song Contest, Turkvision focuses primarily on participating Turkic countries and regions. The participating countries and regions have to take part in the semi-final. TÜRKSOY has stated that televoting is going to be introduced in the future.

History
In December 2020, it was announced that the Tyumen Oblast would participate in Turkvision for the first time, represented by Adilya Tushakova and the song "Havalarda." This will make them the eleventh region of the Russian Federation to participate. She will be representing the Oblast's Tatar minority, which makes up 7.5% of its 3.5 million residents as of 2010.

Participation overview

References

Countries in the Turkvision Song Contest
Turkvision